For a complete list see :Category:Football clubs in Liberia

B
Bame Monrovia
Barrack Young Controllers Football Club

D
Devereux Football Club
Desert Football Club

F
FC Fassell
Fatu Football Club
FCAK-Liberia

G
Ganta Black Stars
Gedi & Sons Football Club

I
[[Innterfada f.c
]

J
Jasmine Rangers Football Club
Jubilee FC
Junior Professional Football Club

K
Keitrace FC

L
Liberia Petroleum Refining Company Oilers
Liberia Ship Corporate Registry Football Club

M
Mark Professionals
Mighty Barrolle
Mighty Blue Angels FC
Monrovia Black Star Football Club
Monrovia Club Breweries
Monrovia FC
Muscat FC (Liberia)

N
National Port Authority Anchors
Nimba Football Club
Nimba United Football Club

S
Saint Joseph Warriors Football Club
St Anthony FC

U
United Soccer Ambassador Football Club

W
Watanga Football Club

External links
 RSSSF

 
Liberia
Football clubs
Football clubs